North Central Victoria is a rural region in the Australian state of Victoria. The region lies to the south of the Victorian/New South Wales border as defined by the Murray River, to the southwest of the Hume region, to the west of the Great Dividing Range contained within the Central Highlands and Victorian Alps, to the north of Greater Melbourne, to the northeast of the Wimmera, and to the east of the Mallee region.

Location 
Sustainability Victoria, a Victorian Government agency, defines North Central Victoria as the municipalities of Buloke, Gannawarra, Loddon, Campaspe, Central Goldfields, Mount Alexander, Macedon Ranges and the City of Greater Bendigo. A climate change study by La Trobe University also includes the  Shire of Hepburn within the region.

The major urban centres are Bendigo, Castlemaine, Maryborough and Rochester. Smaller localities include Kyneton, Pyramid Hill, Kerang, Donald and Creswick. In 2002 the estimated population of North Central Victoria was 200,000.

Administration

Political representation 
For the purposes of Australian federal elections for the House of Representatives, the North Central region is contained within the Division of Bendigo, a southwestern portion of the Division of McEwen, the westernmost portion of the Division of Murray, the northeasternmost portion of the Division of Mallee, and the northeasternmost portion of the Division of Wannon,

For the purposes of Victorian elections for the Legislative Assembly, the North Central region is contained within the electoral districts of Bendigo East, Bendigo West, Macedon, Murray Plains and Ripon.

Local government areas 
For administration purposes the region is divided into eight local government areas:

Environmental protection 
The North Central region contains the Greater Bendigo National Park, Gunbower National Park, Heathcote-Graytown National Park, and the Terrick Terrick National Park.

Climate
The climate is moderate with wet winters and warm, dry summers.

Natural resources 
Natural resource management is administered by the North Central Catchment Management Authority covering   bounded by the Great Dividing Range, the Mount Carmel Ranges to the east and the New South Wales border to the north. This includes the management of rural water allocations and environmental protection for the Avon-Richardson, Avoca, Campaspe and Loddon rivers.

Regional water consumption for irrigation, stock and domestic use greatly exceeds local supply. More than 75% of regional water needs are met from water imports from the Goulburn Valley and upper Murray River catchments to the north and west.

An extensive network of natural lakes includes Lake Buloke (the terminus for the Avon-Richardson River), Lake Batyo Catyo near the town of Donald, and a northern network comprising Lakes Boort, Merna, Kangaroo, Charm, Lalbert and Boga. Groundwater beneath this northern lakes network supplies approximately 80% of Australia's mineral springs, supplying the bulk of domestically-produced mineral water and providing substantial local employment.

Land use 
The predominant land use is agriculture, including sheep and cattle grazing and the production of cereals, grains and legumes. The gross value of agricultural output exceeds $0.8 billion a year. Forestry is also a major employer in the area surrounding the former gold rush  towns of Creswick and Daylesford, with a substantial output of  firewood, furniture timber and Eucalyptus oil.

Approximately 13% of the North Central catchment is public land, comprising flora reserves and state and national parks.

Notes

References 

 
Regions of Victoria (Australia)